Tumalo Creek is a tributary, about  long, of the Deschutes River, located in Deschutes County in Central Oregon, United States.

It is home to several species of trout, including the Columbia River redband trout. It is the primary drinking water source for the city of Bend.

In 1883, the first known canal to be dug from the creek was created to divert water to farms. The 1979 Bridge Creek Fire and related salvage logging increased erosion and damaged habitats in and near Tumalo Creek. Since 2003, a network of government agencies and volunteer groups have been working to restore fish and wildlife habitat along a  stretch of the stream.

See also 
 List of rivers of Oregon

References

External links

Real-time data, Deschutes Basin

Bend, Oregon
Rivers of Oregon
Rivers of Deschutes County, Oregon
Oregon placenames of Native American origin